Historia de Amour is Yolandita Monge's twelfth (12th) studio album and second with CBS Records (now Sony Music Latin). It follows the same formula of her previous release and includes the hits "Serás Mío", "Perdóname Otra Vez", "Que Te Hice", and "Sí".   Monge won the Buga Festival in Colombia for composing and performing the song "Sí".

The album was re-issued on CD format in 1992 and it is currently out of print in all media formats. Several hits songs appear in various compilations of the singer available as digital downloads at iTunes and Amazon.

Track listing

Credits and personnel

Vocals: Yolandita Monge
String Arrangements & Orchestral Direction: Héctor Garrido
Artistic Repertoire Coordinator: Sergio Rozenblat
Sound Engineers: Jack Sherdel, Eddie Trabanco, Steve Bravin
Mixing Engineer: Jack Sherdel

Photography: Lee Marshall
Make-up: Jane Pittman

Notes

Track listing and credits from album cover.
Released in Cassette Format on 1986 (DKC-10467).
Released in CD Format (Serie De Oro) on 1992 (CDB-80743).

References

Yolandita Monge albums
1981 albums